William Norval Craig (January 16, 1945 – January 1, 2017) was an American competition swimmer, Olympic champion, and world record-holder.  He represented the United States at the 1964 Summer Olympics in Tokyo, where he won a gold medal by swimming the breaststroke leg for the first-place U.S. team in the men's 4×100-meter medley relay.  Craig and his teammates Thompson Mann (backstroke), Fred Schmidt (butterfly) and Steve Clark (freestyle) set a new medley relay world record of 3:58.4. Craig attended the University of Southern California (USC), where he swam for the USC Trojans swimming and diving team. He graduated in 1967.

Craig was last married to Patty Craig, with whom he had a son Christian; he also has a son Rick and daughter Kimber from a previous marriage.

See also
 List of Olympic medalists in swimming (men)
 List of University of Southern California people
 World record progression 4 × 100 metres medley relay

References

External links

1945 births
2017 deaths
American male breaststroke swimmers
World record setters in swimming
Olympic gold medalists for the United States in swimming
Pan American Games gold medalists for the United States
People from Culver City, California
Swimmers at the 1963 Pan American Games
Swimmers at the 1964 Summer Olympics
USC Trojans men's swimmers
Medalists at the 1964 Summer Olympics
Pan American Games medalists in swimming
Medalists at the 1963 Pan American Games